The Groeninge Monument is a monument in the Belgian city of Kortrijk. The gilded statue was inaugurated to commemorate the 600th anniversary of the Battle of the Golden Spurs. The statue is situated in the Groeningepark, where during the Middle Ages the Groeninge battlefield was situated. In this park one can also find the Groeningegate, a triumphal arch, which gives access to the park.

The Groeninge Monument was designed by sculptor Godfried Devreese. It was planned to be inaugurated in 1902, but was not ready until 1906, when it was unveiled on 5 August. The gilded statue represents the Virgin of Flanders, who holds aloft a spear whilst holding in the other the Flemish Lion.

Buildings and structures in Kortrijk
History of Kortrijk
Gates in Belgium
Monuments and memorials in Belgium
Tourist attractions in West Flanders